Ghana Senior High School may refer to:
 Ghana Senior High School, Koforidua (GHANASS)
 Ghana Senior High School (Tamale) (GHANASCO)